Spare Change may refer to:

 Spare Change News, a street newspaper founded in 1992 and published in Cambridge, Massachusetts 
 Spare Change (novel), a 2007 crime novel by Robert B. Parker
 Spare Change Payments, an online payments company
 Spare Change (video game), a 1983 video game for various home computer models.
 "Spare Chaynge", song by Jefferson Airplane
 Spare Change (film), a 2015 American comedy film